Selma Alispahić (born 10 March 1970) is a Bosnian actress.

Biography
Alispahić was born in Tuzla, Bosnia and Herzegovina in 1970.

Filmography

Films
Milky Way (2000)
Broken Mussels (2011)
A Stranger (2013)
Selam (2013)

Television
Bliss (1995; television film)
Bez rizika (2011)

Shorts
Igraj do kraja (2000)
Priča bez kraja (2012)

References

External links

1970 births
Living people
Actors from Tuzla
20th-century Bosnia and Herzegovina actresses
Bosniaks of Bosnia and Herzegovina
21st-century Bosnia and Herzegovina actresses
Bosnia and Herzegovina film actresses
Bosnia and Herzegovina stage actresses
Bosnia and Herzegovina television actresses
Bosnia and Herzegovina actresses